Religion in Europe  has been a major influence on today's society, art, culture, philosophy and law. The largest religion in Europe is Christianity, but irreligion and practical secularisation are strong. Three countries in Southeastern Europe have Muslim majorities. Ancient European religions included veneration for deities such as Zeus. Modern revival movements of these religions include Heathenism, Rodnovery, Romuva, Druidry, Wicca, and others. Smaller religions include the Dharmic religions, Judaism, and some East Asian religions, which are found in their largest groups in Britain, France, and Kalmykia.

Little is known about the prehistoric religion of Neolithic Europe. Bronze and Iron Age religion in Europe as elsewhere was predominantly polytheistic (Ancient Greek religion, Ancient Roman religion, Basque mythology, Finnish paganism, Celtic polytheism, Germanic paganism, etc.).

The Roman Empire officially adopted Christianity in AD 380. During the Early Middle Ages, most of Europe underwent Christianization, a process essentially complete with the Christianization of Scandinavia in the High Middle Ages. The notion of "Europe" and the "Western World" has been intimately connected with the concept of "Christendom", and many even consider Christianity as the unifying belief that created a European identity, especially since Christianity in the Middle East was marginalized by the rise of Islam from the 8th century. This confrontation led to the Crusades, which ultimately failed militarily, but were an important step in the emergence of a European identity based on religion. Despite this, traditions of folk religion continued at all times, largely independent from institutional religion or dogmatic theology.

The Great Schism of the 11th century and Reformation of the 16th century tore apart Christendom into hostile factions, and following the Age of Enlightenment of the 18th century, atheism and agnosticism have spread across Europe. Nineteenth-century Orientalism contributed to a certain popularity of Hinduism and Buddhism, and the 20th century brought increasing syncretism, New Age, and various new religious movements divorcing spirituality from inherited traditions for many Europeans. Recent times have seen increased secularisation and religious pluralism.

Religiosity

Some European countries have experienced a decline in church membership and church attendance. A relevant example of this trend is Sweden where the Church of Sweden, previously the state-church until 2000, claimed to have 82.9% of the Swedish population as its flock in 2000. Surveys showed this had dropped to 72.9% by 2008 and to 56.4% by 2019. Moreover, in the 2005 Eurobarometer survey 23% of the Swedish population said that they do not believe there is any sort of spirit, God or life force and in the 2010 Eurobarometer survey 34% said the same.

Gallup survey 2008–2009

During 2008–2009, a Gallup survey asked in several countries the question "Is religion important in your daily life?" The table and map below shows percentage of people who answered "Yes" to the question.

During 2007–2008, a Gallup poll asked in several countries the question "Does religion occupy an important place in your life?" The table on right shows percentage of people who answered "No".

Eurobarometer survey 2010

The 2010 Eurobarometer survey found that, on average, 51% of the citizens of the EU member states state that they "believe there is a God", 26% "believe there is some sort of spirit or life force" while 20% "don't believe there is any sort of spirit, God or life force". 3% declined to answer.
According to a recent study (Dogan, Mattei, Religious Beliefs in Europe: Factors of Accelerated Decline), 47% of French people declared themselves as agnostics in 2003. This situation is often called "Post-Christian Europe". A decrease in religiousness and church attendance in Denmark, Belgium, France, Germany, Netherlands, and Sweden has been noted, despite a concurrent increase in some countries like Greece (2% in 1 year). The Eurobarometer survey must be taken with caution, however, as there are discrepancies between it and national census results. For example, in the United Kingdom, the 2001 census revealed over 70% of the population regarded themselves as "Christian" with only 15% professing to have "no religion", though the wording of the question has been criticized as "leading" by the British Humanist Association. Romania, one of the most religious countries in Europe, witnessed a threefold increase in the number of atheists between 2002 and 2011, as revealed by the most recent national census.

The following is a list of European countries ranked by religiosity, based on the rate of belief, according to the Eurobarometer survey 2010. The 2010 Eurobarometer survey asked whether the person "believes there is a God", "believes there is some sort of spirit or life force", or "doesn't believe there is any sort of spirit, God or life force".

The decrease in theism is illustrated in the 1981 and 1999 according to the World Values Survey, both for traditionally strongly theist countries (Spain: 86.8%:81.1%; Ireland 94.8%:93.7%) and for traditionally secular countries (Sweden: 51.9%:46.6%; France 61.8%:56.1%; Netherlands 65.3%:58.0%). Some countries nevertheless show increase of theism over the period, Italy 84.1%:87.8%, Denmark 57.8%:62.1%. For a comprehensive study on Europe, see Mattei Dogan's "Religious Beliefs in Europe: Factors of Accelerated Decline" in Research in the Social Scientific Study of Religion.

Eurobarometer survey 2019

According to the 2019 Eurobarometer survey about Religiosity in the European Union Christianity is the largest religion in the European Union accounting 64% of the EU population, down from 72% in 2012. Catholics are the largest Christian group in EU, accounting for 41% of EU population, while Eastern Orthodox make up 10%, and Protestants make up 9%, and other Christians account for 4% of the EU population. Non believer/Agnostic account 17%, Atheist 10%, and Muslim 2% of the EU population. 3% refuse to answer or didn't know.

Maps

Pew Research Poll
According to the 2012 Global Religious Landscape survey by the Pew Research Center, 75.2% of the Europe residents are Christians, 18.2% are irreligious, atheist or agnostic, 5.9% are Muslims and 0.2% are Jews, 0.2% are Hindus, 0.2% are Buddhist, and 0.1% adhere to other religions. According to the 2015 Religious Belief and National Belonging in Central and Eastern Europe survey by the Pew Research Center, 57.9% of the Central and Eastern Europeians identified as Orthodox Christians, and according to a 2018 study by the Pew Research Center, 71.0% of Western Europeans identified as Christians, 24.0% identified as religiously unaffiliated and 5% identified as adhere to other religions. According to the same study a large majority (83%) of those who were raised as Christians in Western Europe still identify as such, and the remainder mostly self-identify as religiously unaffiliated.

Pew Research Poll

(*) 13% of respondents in Hungary identify as Presbyterian. In Estonia and Latvia, 20%
and 19%, respectively, identify as Lutherans. And in Lithuania, 14% say they are "just a
Christian" and do not specify a particular denomination. They are included in the "other"
category.
(**) Identified as "don't know/refused" from the "other/idk/ref" column are excluded from this statistic.
(***) Figures may not add to subtotals due to rounding.

(**) Identified with answers "don't know/refused" are not shown.

Abrahamic religions

Bahá'í Faith

The first newspaper reference to the religious movement began with coverage of the Báb, whom Bahá'ís consider the forerunner of the Bahá'í Faith, which occurred in The Times on 1 November 1845, only a little over a year after the Báb first started his mission. British, Russian, and other diplomats, businessmen, scholars, and world travelers also took note of the precursor Bábí religion most notably in 1865 by Frenchman Arthur de Gobineau who wrote the first and most influential account. In April 1890 Edward G. Browne of Cambridge University met Bahá'u'lláh, the prophet-founder of the Bahá'í Faith, and left the only detailed description by a Westerner.

Starting in the 1890s Europeans began to convert to the religion. In 1910 Bahá'u'lláh's son and appointed successor, 'Abdu'l-Bahá embarked on a three-year journey to including Europe and North America and then wrote a series of letters that were compiled together in the book titled Tablets of the Divine Plan which included mention of the need to spread the religion in Europe following the war.

A 1925 list of "leading local Bahá'í Centres" of Europe listed organized communities of many countries – the largest being in Germany. However the religion was soon banned in a couple of countries: in 1937 Heinrich Himmler disbanded the Bahá'í Faith's institutions in Germany because of its 'international and pacifist tendencies' and in Russia in 1938 "monstrous accusations" against Bahá'ís and a Soviet government policy of oppression of religion resulted in Bahá'í communities in 38 cities across Soviet territories ceasing to exist. However the religion recovered in both countries. The religion has generally spread such that in recent years the Association of Religion Data Archives estimated the Bahá'ís in European countries to number in hundreds to tens of thousands.

Christianity

The majority of Europeans describe themselves as Christians, divided into a large number of denominations. Christian denominations are usually classed in three categories: Catholicism (consider only two groups, the Roman-Latin Catholic and the Eastern Greek and Armenian Catholics), Orthodoxy (consider only two groups, the Eastern Byzantine Orthodox and the Armenian Apostolic which is within the Oriental Orthodox Church) and Protestantism (a diverse group including Lutheranism, Calvinism and Anglicanism as well as numerous minor denominations, including Baptists, Methodism, Evangelicalism, Pentecostalism, etc.).

Christianity, more specifically the Catholic Church, which played an important part in the shaping of Western civilization since at least the 4th century. Historically, Europe has been the center and "cradle of Christian civilization".

European culture, throughout most of its recent history, has been heavily influenced by Christian belief and has been nearly equivalent to Christian culture. The Christian culture was one of the more dominant forces to influence Western civilization, concerning the course of philosophy, art, music, science, social structure and architecture. The civilizing influence of Christianity includes social welfare, founding hospitals, economics (as the Protestant work ethic), politics, architecture, literature and family life.

Christianity is still the largest religion in Europe. According to a survey about Religiosity in the European Union in 2019 by Eurobarometer, Christianity was the largest religion in the European Union accounting 64% of EU population, down from 72% in 2012. Catholics were the largest Christian group in EU, and accounted for 41% of the EU population, while Eastern Orthodox made up 10%, Protestants made up 9%, and other Christians 4%. According to a 2010 study by the Pew Research Center, 76.2% of the European population identified themselves as Christians, constitute in absolute terms the world's largest Christian population.

Christian denominations 

 Catholicism (majorly followed to the Roman–Latin Catholic Church with various minorities of the few Greek Catholic Churches in the Eastern European regions, and the Armenian Catholic Church in Armenia and its diaspora) is the largest denomination with adherents mostly existing in Latin Europe (which includes France, Italy, Spain, Portugal, Malta, San Marino, Monaco, Vatican City,); southern [Wallon] Belgium, Czech Republic, Ireland, Lithuania, Poland, Hungary, Slovakia, Slovenia, Croatia, western Ukraine, parts of Bosnia and Herzegovina (Mostly in predominantly Croat areas), but also the southern parts of Germanic Europe (which includes Austria, Luxembourg, northern Flemish Belgium, southern and western Germany, parts of the Netherlands, parts of Switzerland, and Liechtenstein).
 Orthodox Christianity (the churches are in full communion, i.e. the national churches are united in theological concept and part of the One, Holy, Catholic and Apostolic Eastern Orthodox Church)
 Ecumenical Patriarchate of Constantinople
 Russian Orthodox Church
 Serbian Orthodox Church
 Romanian Orthodox Church
 Church of Greece
 Bulgarian Orthodox Church
 Georgian Orthodox Church
 Finnish Orthodox Church
 Cypriot Orthodox Church
 Albanian Orthodox Church
 Polish Orthodox Church
 Church of the Czech Lands and Slovakia
 Ukrainian Orthodox Church
 Turkish Orthodox Church
 Macedonian Orthodox Church – Ohrid Archbishopric
 Montenegrin Orthodox Church
 Oriental Orthodoxy
 Armenian Apostolic Church
 Armenian Patriarchate of Constantinople
 
 Protestantism
 Lutheranism
 Independent Evangelical-Lutheran Church
 Danish National Church
 Estonian Evangelical Lutheran Church
 Evangelical Lutheran Church of Finland
 Evangelical Lutheran Church—Synod of France and Belgium
 Evangelical Church in Germany
 Evangelical-Lutheran Church in Hungary
 Evangelical Lutheran Church of Latvia
 Church of Norway
 Church of Sweden
 Anglicanism
 Church of England
 Church of Ireland
 Scottish Episcopal Church
 Church in Wales
 Lusitanian Catholic Apostolic Evangelical Church
 Spanish Reformed Episcopal Church
 Calvinism
 United Reformed Church
 Evangelical Presbyterian Church in England and Wales
 Reformed Church in Hungary
 Church of Scotland
 Presbyterian Church in Ireland
 Methodist Church of Great Britain
 Protestant Church in the Netherlands (Neo-Calvinism)
 Reformed Church of France
 Swiss Reformed Church
 Restorationism
 The Church of Jesus Christ of Latter-day Saints
 Jehovah’s Witnesses
 Other
 Baptist Union of Great Britain
 Baptist Union of Sweden
 Bruderhof Communities
 Seventh-day Adventist Church

There are numerous minor Protestant movements, including various Evangelical congregations.

Islam

Islam came to parts of European islands and coasts on the Mediterranean Sea during the 8th-century Muslim conquests. In the Iberian Peninsula and parts of southern France, various Muslim states existed before the Reconquista; Islam spread in southern Italy briefly through the Emirate of Sicily and Emirate of Bari. During the Ottoman expansion, Islam was spread from into the Balkans and even part of Central Europe. Muslims have also been historically present in Ukraine (Crimea and vicinity, with the Crimean Tatars), as well as modern-day Russia, beginning with Volga Bulgaria in the 10th century and the conversion of the Golden Horde to Islam. In recent years, Muslims have migrated to Europe as residents and temporary workers.

According to the Pew Forum, the total number of Muslims in Europe in 2010 was about 44 million (6%). While the total number of Muslims in the European Union in 2007 was about 16 million (3.2%). Data from the 2000s for the rates of growth of Islam in Europe showed that the growing number of Muslims was due primarily to immigration and higher birth rates.

Muslims make up 99% of the population in Turkey, Northern Cyprus, 96% in Kosovo, 56% in Albania, 51% in Bosnia and Herzegovina, 32.17% in North Macedonia, 20% in Montenegro, between 10 and 15% in Russia, 7–9% in France, 8% in Bulgaria, 6% in the Netherlands, 5% in Denmark, United Kingdom and Germany, just over 4% in Switzerland and Austria, and between 3 and 4% in Greece.

A survey conducted by the Pew Research Center in 2016 found that Muslims make up 4.9% of all of Europe's population. According to a same study conversion does not add significantly to the growth of the Muslim population in Europe, with roughly 160,000 more people leaving Islam than converting into Islam between 2010 and 2016.

Judaism

The Jews were dispersed within the Roman Empire from the 2nd century. At one time Judaism was practiced widely throughout the European continent; throughout the Middle Ages, Jews were accused of ritual murder and faced pogroms and legal discrimination. The Holocaust perpetrated by Nazi Germany decimated the Jewish population, and today, France is home to the largest Jewish community in Europe with 1% of the total population (between 483,000 and 500,000 Jews). Other European countries with notable Jewish populations include the United Kingdom (291,000 Jews), Germany (119,000), and Russia (194,000) which is home to Eastern Europe's largest Jewish community. The Jewish population of Europe in 2010 was estimated to be approximately 1.4 million (0.2% of European population) or 10% of the world’s Jewish population.

Deism

During the Enlightenment, Deism became influential especially in France, Germany, the Netherlands, and the United Kingdom. Biblical concepts were challenged by concepts such as a heliocentric universe and other scientific challenges to the Bible. Notable early deists include Voltaire, Kant, and Mendeleev.

Irreligion

The trend towards secularism during the 20th and 21st centuries has a number of reasons, depending on the individual country:
 France has been traditionally laicist since the French Revolution. Today the country is 25% to 32% irreligious. The remaining population is made up evenly of both Christians and people who believe in a god or some form of spiritual life force, but are not involved in organized religion. French society is still secular overall.
 Some parts of Eastern Europe were secularized as a matter of state doctrine under communist rule in the countries of the former Eastern Bloc. Albania was an officially (and constitutionally binding) atheist state from 1967 to 1991. The countries where the most people reported no religious belief were France (33%), Czech Republic (30%), Belgium (27%), Netherlands (27%), Estonia (26%), Germany (25%), Sweden (23%) and Luxembourg (22%). The region of Eastern Germany, which was also under communist rule, is believed to be the least religious region in Europe. Other post-communist countries, however, have seen the opposite effect, with religion being very important in countries such as Romania, Lithuania and Poland.

The trend towards secularism has been less pronounced in the traditionally Catholic countries of Mediterranean Europe. Greece as the only traditionally Eastern Orthodox country in Europe which has not been part of the communist Eastern Bloc also retains a very high religiosity, with in excess of 95% of Greeks adhering to the Greek Orthodox Church.

According to a Pew Research Center Survey in 2012 the religiously unaffiliated (atheists and agnostics) make up about 18.2% of the European population in 2010. According to the same survey the religiously unaffiliated make up the majority of the population in only two European countries: Czech Republic (76%) and Estonia (60%). A newer study (released in 2015) found that in the Netherlands there is also an irreligious majority of 68%.

Atheism and agnosticism

During the late 20th and early 21st centuries, atheism and agnosticism have increased, with falling church attendance and membership in various European countries. The 2010 Eurobarometer survey found that on total average, of the EU28 population, 51% "believe there is a God", 26% "believe there is some sort of spirit or life force", and 20% "don't believe there is any sort of spirit, God or life force".
Across the EU, belief was higher among women, increased with age, those with a strict upbringing, those with the lowest level of formal education and those leaning towards right-wing politics. Results were varied widely between different countries.

According to a survey measuring religious identification in the European Union in 2019 by Eurobarometer, 10% of EU citizens identify themselves as atheists. , the top seven European countries with the most people who viewed themselves as atheists were Czech Republic (22%), France (21%), Sweden (16%), Estonia (15%), Slovenia (14%), Spain (12%) and Netherlands (11%). 17% of EU citizens called themselves non-believers or agnostics and this percentage was the highest in Netherlands (41%), Czech Republic (34%), Sweden (34%), United Kingdom (28%), Estonia (23%), Germany (21%) and Spain (20%).

Modern Paganism

Germanic

Heathenism or Esetroth (Icelandic: Ásatrú), and the organised form Odinism, are names for the modern folk religion of the Germanic nations.

In the United Kingdom Census 2001, 300 people registered as Heathen in England and Wales. However, many Heathens followed the advice of the Pagan Federation (PF) and simply described themselves as "Pagan", while other Heathens did not specify their religious beliefs. In the 2011 census, 1,958 people self-identified as Heathen in England and Wales. A further 251 described themselves as Reconstructionist and may include some people reconstructing Germanic paganism.

Ásatrúarfélagið (Esetroth Fellowship) was recognized as an official religion by the Icelandic government in 1973. For its first 20 years it was led by farmer and poet Sveinbjörn Beinteinsson. By 2003, it had 777 members, and by 2014, it had 2,382 members, corresponding to 0.8% of Iceland's population. In Iceland, Germanic religion has an impact larger than the number of its adherents.

In Sweden, the Swedish Forn Sed Assembly (Forn Sed, or the archaic Forn Siðr, means "Old Custom") was formed in 1994 and is since 2007 recognized as a religious organization by the Swedish government. In Denmark Forn Siðr was formed in 1999, and was officially recognized in 2003 The Norwegian Åsatrufellesskapet Bifrost (Esetroth Fellowship Bifrost) was formed in 1996; as of 2011, the fellowship has some 300 members. Foreningen Forn Sed was formed in 1999, and has been recognized by the Norwegian government as a religious organization. In Spain there is the Odinist Community of Spain – Ásatrú.

Roman
The Roman polytheism also known as Religio Romana (Roman religion) in Latin or the Roman Way to the Gods (in Italian 'Via romana agli Déi') is alive in small communities and loosely related organizations, mainly in Italy.

Druidry
The religious development of Druidry was largely influenced by Iolo Morganwg. Modern practises aim to imitate the practises of the Celtic peoples of the Iron Age.

Official religions
A number of countries in Europe have official religions, including Greece, Liechtenstein, Malta, Monaco, the Vatican City (Catholic); Armenia (Apostolic Orthodoxy) ; Denmark, Iceland and the United Kingdom (England alone) (Anglican). In Switzerland, some cantons are officially Catholic, others Reformed Protestant. Some Swiss villages even have their religion as well as the village name written on the signs at their entrances.

Georgia, while technically has no official church per se, has special constitutional agreement with Georgian Orthodox Church, which enjoys de facto privileged status. Much the same applies in Germany with the Evangelical Church and the Roman Catholic Church, and the Jewish community. In Finland, both the Finnish Orthodox Church and the Lutheran Church are official. England, a part of the United Kingdom, has Anglicanism as its official religion. Scotland, another part of the UK, has Presbyterianism as its national church, but it is no longer "official". In Sweden, the national church used to be Lutheranism, but it is no longer "official" since 2000. Azerbaijan, Czech Republic, Germany, France, Ireland, Italy, Luxembourg, Portugal, Serbia, Romania, Russia, Spain and Turkey are officially secular.

Indian religions

Buddhism

Buddhism is thinly spread throughout Europe, and the fastest growing religion in recent years with about 3 million adherents. In Kalmykia, Tibetan Buddhism is prevalent.

Hinduism

Hinduism mainly among Indian immigrants. Growing rapidly in recent years, notably in the United Kingdom, France, and the Netherlands. In 1998, there were an estimated 1.4 million Hindu adherents in Europe.

Jainism

Jainism, small membership rolls, mainly among Indian immigrants in Belgium and the United Kingdom, as well as several converts from western and northern Europe.

Sikhism
Sikhism has nearly 700,000 adherents in Europe. Most of the community live in United Kingdom (450,000) and Italy (100,000). Around 10,000 Sikhs live in Belgium and France. Netherlands and Germany have a Sikh population of 22,000. All other countries, such as Greece, have 5,000 or fewer Sikhs.

Other religions

Other religions represented in Europe include:
 Animism
 Confucianism
 Eckankar
 Ietsism
 Raëlism
 Beliefs of the Romani people
 Romuva
 Satanism
 Shinto
 Spiritualism
 Taoism
 Thelema
 Unitarian Universalism
 Yazidism
 Zoroastrianism
 Rastafari communities in the United Kingdom, France, Spain, Portugal, Italy and elsewhere.
 Traditional African Religions (including Muti), mainly in the United Kingdom and France, including
 West African Vodun and Haitian Vodou (Voodoo), mainly among West African and black Caribbean immigrants in the UK and France.

See also

 Buddhism by country
 Christianity in Europe
 Europeanism
 Hinduism by country
 Irreligion (no faith) by country
 Islam by country
 Judaism by country
 List of religious populations
 Major world religions
 Protestantism by country
 Post Christianity
 Religion in the European Union
 Roman Catholicism by country

References

External links

 Eurel: sociological and legal data on religions in Europe and beyond